Christine Stephen-Daly (born 1973) is an Australian actress. Her television credits include Pacific Drive (1996), Casualty (2001–04), Cutting It (2005), and House of Saddam (2008).

Biography
Stephen-Daly grew up in Melbourne with her father Paul, an entrepreneur and owner of a restaurant; mother Rhonnda, a housewife; and three sisters.

Stephen-Daly's first break came in the role of Amber Kingsley in Pacific Drive. She appeared in a number of other Australian television programmes including Farscape, Stingers and Something in the Air.

She then went to the United Kingdom in September 2000 to have a break from acting in Australia. She had a guest appearance in EastEnders before landing the role as Lara Stone in the BBC One medical drama Casualty. A role which she played for three years, she then went on to appear in Cutting It.

Stephen-Daly has also appeared in The Bill. She portrayed the role of Samira Shahbandar, Saddam Hussein's second wife in the BBC drama House of Saddam. Stephen-Daly also appeared in the popular children's CBBC science fiction series, The Sarah Jane Adventures.

She appears in the final run of Neighbours in 2022.

Notable appearances

Film 
Love and Other Catastrophes (1996)
Crimes of Fashion (1998)
Change of Heart (1999)
Me Myself I (1999)

Television 
Pacific Drive (1996)
Farscape (1999)
Stingers (1999)
Something in the Air (2000)
EastEnders (2001)
Casualty (2001–2004)
Cutting It (2005)
The Bill (2006–2007)
House of Saddam (2008)
The Sarah Jane Adventures (2011)
Emmerdale (2012)
Neighbours (2022)

External links

BBC.co.uk  — Christine's official Casualty webpage.  Dead Link

1973 births
Living people
Australian soap opera actresses
Actresses from Melbourne
20th-century Australian actresses
21st-century Australian actresses
Australian emigrants to England